Frauenarzt Dr. Markus Merthin is a German television series.

See also
List of German television series

External links
 

German medical television series
1994 German television series debuts
1997 German television series endings
German-language television shows
ZDF original programming